Strombosia nana is a tree in the family Olacaceae. It is endemic to Sri Lanka. Its taxonomic description is unresolved yet.

Ecology
It is found in the rain forest understory of wet zone Sri Lanka and widely found in the Sinharaja Rainforest.

Culture
Known as "හොර කහ - hora kaha" by Sinahalese people.

References
 http://www.theplantlist.org/tpl1.1/record/kew-2602320
 http://plants.jstor.org/specimen/k000685103?history=true
 http://www.sinharaja.4t.com/pages/vegetation_structure.htm

Olacaceae
Flora of Sri Lanka